Georgios Theocharis may refer to:
 Georgios Theocharis (diplomat)
 Georgios Theocharis (footballer)